Mindless Self Indulgence (often referred to as MSI) is an American electropunk band formed in New York City in 1997. Their music has a mixed style which includes punk rock, alternative rock, electronica, techno, industrial, hip hop, and breakbeat hardcore.

History 
Between 1987 and 1996, Jimmy Urine recorded about 35 songs which varied in musical style, usually settling in an industrial/electronic punk style. These songs were recorded with himself and his brother, Markus Euringer in New York City using rudimentary equipment. Urine and his brother released an album titled Mindless Self-Indulgence, featuring Steve, Righ?, on 'Bed of Roses', which featured songs performed in an industrial style akin to Nine Inch Nails.

In 1997, Urine recorded a cover of Method Man's "Bring the Pain" that was made by merging six different styles of the same cover into one song. This became the basis for the Mindless Self Indulgence sound. The band formed soon after when Urine was joined by Steve, Righ? on guitar, Urine's brother Markus Euringer on second guitar (replaced by bassist Vanessa Y.T., who was subsequently replaced by bassist Lyn-Z), and Urine's cousin Kitty on drums. They have released six albums, four EPs, eight remix albums, one live album, one compilation album, and one live DVD. Rather than signing traditional record contracts, the band has licensed most of their albums to record labels, retaining ownership of the music.

In summer of 2007, the band toured as part of the Revolution Stage of Projekt Revolution, a music festival hosted by Linkin Park. In January 2009, the band headlined the Kerrang! Relentless Energy Drink tour.

In December 2010, they released a comic titled Adventures Into Mindless Self Indulgence about various tour stories and significant moments of the band's career. The band released a remastered CD/DVD version of their first full-length album, Tight, in 2011, titled Tighter. It included bonus tracks and recordings from their early days. On October 25, 2012, the band announced their fifth album via a Kickstarter campaign. How I Learned to Stop Giving a Shit and Love Mindless Self Indulgence was released in May 2013, following with the release of singles "It Gets Worse" in December and "Fuck Machine" in January 2014. Later in January 2014, the band announced that they would be taking a hiatus.

On September 18, 2015, Mindless Self Indulgence released Pink, a collection of 19 songs recorded between 1990 and 1997 by Urine. The album includes cut-down and remastered versions of songs from the self-titled album, an audio diary recorded by Urine from July 1992, and covers of Depeche Mode's "Personal Jesus" and Duran Duran's "Girls on Film".

Sexual assault allegations against Jimmy Urine 
On August 9, 2021, a lawsuit was filed against James Euringer (Jimmy Urine) in New York Supreme Court with the charge of sexual battery of a minor. In the suit, the accuser, whose identity was left anonymous because she was a minor at the time, claims that she had a sexual relationship with Euringer for over two years — from January 1997 to June 1999 — starting when she was 15 years old and Euringer was 27. Euringer, the suit alleges, "groomed and manipulated [her] into believing that his sexually assaultive behavior was not criminal and that by engaging in sexual activity with him Plaintiff was actually helping to protect younger girls from sexual assaults." Euringer knew the accuser was a minor, according to the suit, having at one point written her a letter wishing her a happy fifteenth birthday. "During this time, Euringer acted as and treated Plaintiff as though she was his girlfriend and the two were in a consensual relationship," says the suit.

According to the lawsuit, it is alleged that throughout the relationship, Euringer took pictures of the plaintiff naked and requested that she "act like a small child, suck her thumb, drool, and pee in her pants," during sexual acts. Euringer also allegedly bought the accuser a fake ID so she could go to concerts with him and drink alcohol. Euringer allegedly tried to hide their relationship by telling her not to act affectionately with him while in public. The lawsuit claims that the woman has suffered emotional distress since the relationship started.

Members

Current members 
 Jimmy Urine – lead vocals, synthesizer, programming (1997–present)
 Steve, Righ? – guitars, backing vocals (1997–present)
 Kitty – drums (1996–present)
 Lyn-Z – bass (2001–present)

Former members 
 Markus Euringer – guitars, bass (1997–1998)
 Vanessa Y.T. – bass (1998–2001)

Discography

Studio albums

Live albums

Compilations

Demo albums 
Crappy Little Demo (1997)
Thank God Demo (2001)

EPs

Singles

The Left Rights 

Side project by Jimmy Urine and Steve, Righ?

The Left Rights
 Released: September 24, 2002
 Label: Uppity Cracker

Bad Choices Made Easy
 Released: November 9, 2010
 Label: Metropolis

Videography

Video albums

References

External links 

Musical groups established in 1997
American industrial rock musical groups
American electronic rock musical groups
Digital hardcore music groups
Musical quartets
Alternative rock groups from New York (state)
Electropunk musical groups
Metropolis Records artists
The End Records artists
Elektra Records artists
Punk rock groups from New York (state)